Avalon (literally meaning "the isle of fruit [or apple] trees"; also written Avallon or Avilion among various other spellings) is a mythical island featured in the Arthurian legend. It first appeared in Geoffrey of Monmouth's influential 1136 Historia Regum Britanniae as a place of magic where King Arthur's sword Excalibur was made and later where Arthur was taken to recover from being gravely wounded at the Battle of Camlann. Since then, the island has become a symbol of Arthurian mythology, similar to Arthur's castle of Camelot.  

Avalon was associated from an early date with mystical practices and magical figures such as King Arthur's sorceress sister Morgan, cast as the island's ruler by Geoffrey and some of the later authors inspired by him. Certain Briton traditions maintain that Arthur is an eternal king who had never truly died but would return as the "once and future" king, and the particular motif of his rest in Morgan's care in Avalon has become especially popular and can be found in various versions in many French and other medieval Arthurian and other works written in the wake of Geoffrey.

Avalon has been often identified as the former island of Glastonbury Tor, an early and long-standing belief that notably involved the purported discovery of Arthur's remains and their later grand reburial in accordance with the medieval English tradition in which Arthur did not survive the fatal injuries which he suffered in his final battle. Besides Glastonbury, several other alternative locations of Avalon have been claimed or proposed as well. Some medieval sources also occasionally described the place as a valley.

Etymology
Geoffrey of Monmouth calls it Insula Avallonis in Latin, in his pseudo-chronicle Historia Regum Britanniae ("The History of the Kings of Britain", c. 1136). In his later Vita Merlini ("The Life of Merlin", c. 1150), Geoffrey calls it Insula Pomorum, the "Isle of Fruit Trees" (from Latin pōmus "fruit tree"). The name is generally considered to be of Welsh origin (a Cornish or Breton origin is also possible), from Old Welsh, Old Cornish, or Old Breton aball or avallen(n), "apple tree, fruit tree" (cf. Welsh afal, from Proto-Celtic *abalnā, literally "fruit-bearing (thing)").

The tradition of an "apple" island among the ancient Britons may also be related to Irish legends of the otherworld island home of Manannán mac Lir and Lugh, Emain Ablach (also the Old Irish poetic name for Isle of Man), where Ablach means "Having Apple Trees"— from Old Irish aball ("apple") — and is similar to the Middle Welsh name Afallach, which was used to replace the name Avalon in medieval Welsh translations of French and Latin Arthurian tales. All are related to the Gaulish root *aballo "fruit tree" (found in the place name Aballo/Aballone) and are derived from Proto-Celtic *abal- "apple", which is related at the Indo-European level to English apple, Russian яблоко (jabloko), Latvian ābele, et al.

In the early 12th century, William of Malmesbury claimed the name of Avalon came from a man called Avalloc, who once lived on this isle with his daughters. Gerald of Wales similarly derived the name of Avalon from its purported former ruler, Avallo. The name is also similar to "Avallus", described by Pliny the Elder in his 1st-century Naturalis Historia as a mysterious island where amber could be found.

Legend

Geoffrey of Monmouth

According to Geoffrey in the Historia, and much subsequent literature which he inspired, King Arthur was taken to Avalon (Avallon) in hope that he could be saved and recover from his mortal wounds following the tragic Battle of Camlann. Avalon is first mentioned by Geoffrey as the place where Arthur's sword Excalibur (Caliburn) was forged.

Geoffrey dealt with the subject in more detail in the Vita Merlini, in which he describes for the first time in Arthurian legend the fairy or fae-like enchantress Morgan (Morgen) as the chief of nine sisters (including Moronoe, Mazoe, Gliten, Glitonea, Gliton, Tyronoe and Thiten) who rule Avalon. Geoffrey's telling (in the in-story narration by the bard Taliesin) indicates a sea voyage was needed to get there. His description of Avalon here, which is heavily indebted to the early medieval Spanish scholar Isidore of Seville (being mostly derived from the section on famous islands in Isidore's famous work Etymologiae, XIV.6.8 "Fortunatae Insulae"), shows the magical nature of the island:

Geoffrey's Merlin not only never visits Avalon but is not even aware of its existence. This would change to various degree in the later Arthurian prose romance tradition that expanded on Merlin's association with Arthur as well on Avalon itself.

Later medieval literature

In many later versions of Arthurian legend, including the popular Le Morte d'Arthur by Thomas Malory, Morgan and a number of other magical queens (either three, four or "many") arrive after the battle to take the mortally wounded Arthur from the battlefield of Camlann (or Salisbury Plain in the romances) to Avalon in a black boat. Besides Morgan, who by this time has already become Arthur's sibling in the popular narrative, they sometimes come with the Lady of the Lake among them; the others may include the Queen of Northgales (North Wales) and the Queen of the Wasteland. In the Vulgate Queste, Morgan first tells Arthur of her intention to relocate to Avalon, "where the ladies who know all the magic in the world are" (où les dames sont qui seiuent tous les enchantemens del monde) prior to his final battle.  This is the only direct reference to Avalon in the entire Vulgate Cycle in its original French version. Its Welsh version was also claimed, within its text, to be a translation of old Latin books from Avalon, as was the French Perlesvaus.

In Erec and Enide, an early Arthurian romance by Chrétien de Troyes, the consort of Morgan early during King Arthur's rule is the Lord of the Isle of Avalon, Arthur's nephew Guinguemar (also appearing in the same or similar role under alike names in other works). In his final romance, Perceval, the Story of the Grail, Chrétien also featured the sea fortress of Escavalon, ruled by the King of Escavalon. The word Escavalon can be literally translated as "Water-Avalon", albeit some scholars proposed various other developments from Avalon (with Roger Sherman Loomis noting the similarity of the evolution of Geoffrey's Caliburn into the Chrétien's Escalibur in the case of Excalibur) or perhaps from the Old French words for either 'Slav' or 'Saracen'. It was renamed as Askalon in Parzival by Wolfram von Eschenbach who might have been either confused or inspired by the real-life coastal city of Ascalon (today's Ashkelon in Israel). It is also possible that Escavalon turned into Escalot (Malory's Astolat) in later Arthurian romances. Escalot and Escavalon appear concurrently in the Vulgate Cycle, in which the latter is ruled by King Alain, whose daughter Floree gives birth to Gawain's son Guinglain.

In Layamon's Brut, Arthur is taken to Avalon to be healed there through means of magic water by a distinctively Anglo-Saxon version of Morgan: an elf queen of Avalon named Argante. The German Diu Crône says the Queen of Avalon is the goddess (göttin) Enfeidas, Arthur's aunt (sister of Uther Pendragon) and one of guardians of the Grail. The Venician Les Prophéties de Merlin features the character of an enchantress known only as the Lady of Avalon (Dame d'Avalon), a Merlin's apprentice who is a fierce rival of Morgan as well as of Sebile, another of Merlin's female students. In the late Italian Tavola Ritonda, the lady of the island of Avalon (dama dell'isola di Vallone, likely the same as the Lady of Avalon from the Propheties) is a fairy mother of the evil sorceress Elergia. The tales of the half-fairy Melusine have her grow up in the isle of Avalon.

In Lope Garcia de Salazar's Spanish version of the Post-Vulgate Roman du Graal, Avalon is conflated with (and explicitly named as) the mythological Island of Brasil, said to be located west of Ireland and afterwards hidden in mist by Morgan's enchantment. Avalon has been occasionally described as a valley. In Le Morte d'Arthur, for instance, Avalon is called an isle twice and a vale once (the latter in the scene of Arthur's final voyage, oddly in spite of Malory's adoption of the boat travel motif). Notably, the vale of Avalon (vaus d'Avaron) is mentioned twice in Robert de Boron's Arthurian prequel Joseph d'Arimathie as a place located in the western Britannia, to where a fellowship of early Christians started by Joseph of Arimathea brought the Grail after its long journey from the Holy Land, finally delivered there by Bron the first Fisher King.

Arthur's fate in Avalon is sometimes left untold, or uncertain. Other times, his eventual death is actually confirmed, as it happens in the Stanzaic Morte Arthur, where the Archbishop of Canterbury later receives Arthur's dead body and buries it at Glastonbury. In the telling from Alliterative Morte Arthure, relatively devoid of supernatural elements, it is not Morgan but the renowned physicians from Salerno who try, and fail, to save Arthur's life in Avalon. Conversely, the Gesta Regum Britanniae, an early rewrite of Geoffrey's Historia, states (in the present tense) that Morgan "keeps his healed body for her very own and they now live together." In a similar narrative, the chronicle Draco Normannicus contains a fictional letter from King Arthur to Henry II of England, claiming Arthur having been healed of his wounds and made immortal by his "deathless (eternal) nymph" sister Morgan in the holy island of Avalon (Avallonis eas insula sacra) through the island's miraculous herbs.

Morgan also features as an immortal ruler of a fantastic Avalon, sometimes alongside the still-alive Arthur, in some subsequent and otherwise non-Arthurian chivalric romances such as Tirant lo Blanch, as well as the tales of Huon of Bordeaux, where the faery king Oberon is a son of either Morgan by name or "the Lady of the Secret Isle", and the legend of Ogier the Dane, where Avalon can be described as an enchanted fairy castle (chasteu d'Auallon), as it is also in Floriant et Florete. In his La Faula, Guillem de Torroella claims to have visited the Enchanted Island (Illa Encantada) and met Arthur who has been brought back to life by Morgan and they both of them are now forever young, sustained by the Grail. In the chanson de geste La Bataille Loquifer, Morgan and her sister Marsion (Marrion) bring the hero Renoart to Avalon, where Arthur now prepares his return alongside Morgan, Gawain, Ywain, Perceval and Guinevere. Such stories typically take place centuries after the times of King Arthur.

Connection to Glastonbury 
Though no longer an island in the 12th century, the high conical bulk of Glastonbury Tor in today's South-West England had been surrounded by marsh prior to the draining of fenland in the Somerset Levels. In ancient times, Ponter's Ball Dyke would have guarded the only entrance to the island. The Romans eventually built another road to the island. Glastonbury's earliest name in Welsh was the Isle of Glass, which suggests that the location was at one point seen as an island. At the end of the 12th century, Gerald of Wales wrote in De instructione principis:

Around 1190, monks at Glastonbury Abbey claimed to have discovered the bones of Arthur and his wife Guinevere. The discovery of the burial is described by chroniclers, notably Gerald, as being just after King Henry II's reign when the new abbot of Glastonbury, Henry de Sully, commissioned a search of the abbey grounds. At a depth of 5 m (16 feet), the monks were said to have discovered an unmarked tomb with a massive treetrunk coffin and, also buried, a lead cross bearing the inscription:

Accounts of the exact inscription vary, with five different versions existing. One popular today, made famous by Malory, claims "Here lies Arthur, the king that was and the king that shall be" (Hic iacet Arthurus, rex quondam rexque futurus), also known in the now-popular variant "the once and future king" (rex quondam et futurus). The earliest is by Gerald in Liber de Principis instructione c. 1193, who wrote that he viewed the cross in person and traced the lettering. His transcript reads: "Here lies buried the famous Arthurus with Wenneveria his second wife in the isle of Avalon" (Hic jacet sepultus inclitus rex Arthurus cum Wenneveria uxore sua secunda in insula Avallonia). He wrote that inside the coffin were two bodies, whom Giraldus refers to as Arthur and "his queen"; the bones of the male body were described as being gigantic. The account of the burial by the chronicle of Margam Abbey says three bodies were found, the other being that of Mordred; Richard Barber argues that Mordred's name was airbrushed out of the story once his reputation as a traitor was appreciated. The story is today seen as an example of pseudoarchaeology. Historians generally dismiss the authenticity of the find, attributing it to a publicity stunt performed to raise funds to repair the Abbey, which had been mostly burned in 1184.

In 1278, the remains were reburied with great ceremony, attended by King Edward I and Queen Eleanor of Castile, before the High Altar at Glastonbury Abbey. They were moved again in 1368 when the choir was extended. The site became the focus of pilgrimages until the dissolution of the abbey in 1539. The fact that the search for the body is connected to Henry II and Edward I, both kings who fought major Anglo-Welsh wars, has had scholars suggest that propaganda may have played a part as well. Gerald was a constant supporter of royal authority; in his account of the discovery clearly aims to quash the idea of the possibility of King Arthur's messianic return:

The burial discovery ensured that in later romances, histories based on them and in the popular imagination Glastonbury became increasingly identified with Avalon, an identification that continues strongly today. The later development of the legends of the Holy Grail and Joseph of Arimathea interconnected these legends with Glastonbury and with Avalon, an identification which also seems to be made in Perlesvaus. The popularity of Arthurian romances has meant this area of the Somerset Levels has today become popularly described as the Vale of Avalon.

In more recent times, writers such as Dion Fortune, John Michell, Nicholas Mann and Geoffrey Ashe have formed theories based on perceived links between Glastonbury and Celtic legends of the Otherworld in attempts to link the location firmly with Avalon, drawing on the various legends based on Glastonbury Tor as well as drawing on ideas like Earth mysteries, ley lines and even the myth of Atlantis. Arthurian literature also continues to use Glastonbury as an important location as in The Mists of Avalon, A Glastonbury Romance, and The Bones of Avalon. Even the fact that Somerset has many apple orchards has been drawn in to support the connection. Glastonbury's reputation as the real Avalon has made it a popular site of tourism. Having become one of the major New Age communities in Europe, the area has great religious significance for neo-Pagans and modern Druids, as well as some Christians. Identification of Glastonbury with Avalon within hippie subculture, as seen in the work of Michell and in the Gandalf's Garden community, also helped inspire the annual Glastonbury Festival that eventually became the largest musical and cultural event in the world.

Other proposed locations

Medieval suggestions for the location of Avalon ranged far beyond Glastonbury. They included paradisal underworld realms equated with the other side of the Earth at the antipodes, as well as Mongibel (Mount Etna) in Sicily and other, unnamed locations in the Mediterranean. Pomponius Mela's ancient Roman description of the island of Île de Sein, off the coast of Finistère in Brittany, was notably one of Geoffrey of Monmouth's original inspirations for his Avalon.

More recently, just as in the quest for Arthur's mythical capital Camelot, a large number of locations have been put forward as being the "real Avalon". They include Greenland or other places in or across the Atlantic, the former Roman fort of Aballava in Cumbria, Bardsey Island off the coast of Wales, the isle of Île Aval near present-day Lannion on the coast of Pleumeur-Bodou in Brittany, and Lady's Island in Leinster. In the works of William F. Warren, Avalon was compared to Hyperborea along with the Garden of Eden and theorized to be located in the Arctic. Geoffrey Ashe championed an association of Avalon with the town of Avallon in Burgundy, as part of a theory connecting King Arthur to the Romano-British leader Riothamus who was last seen in that area. Robert Graves identified Avalon with the Spanish island of Majorca (Mallorca), while Laurence Gardner suggested the Isle of Arran off the coast of Scotland. Graham Phillips claimed to have located the grave of the historical Arthur (Owain Ddantgwyn) in the "true site of Avalon" on a former island at Baschurch in Shropshire.

See also

 Annwn – the Welsh otherworld
 Avallónë
 Baltia
 Brittia
 Hyperborea	
 Thule
 Tír na nÓg

Notes

References
Citations

Bibliography

External links

 
Avalon at The Camelot Project

Glastonbury
Fiction about immortality
Fictional populated places
Fictional valleys
Locations associated with Arthurian legend
Locations in Celtic mythology
Mythological islands
Joseph of Arimathea